Sikandar is a 2009 Indian crime drama film written and directed by Piyush Jha. The film features Parzan Dastur in the titular role with R. Madhavan, Sanjay Suri and Ayesha Kapur in pivotal roles. The film has terrorism in the Indian state of Jammu & Kashmir as its backdrop. The film was known in its production stages as Foot Soldier. The film was released on 21 August 2009.

Plot
Sikandar Raza (Parzan Dastur) is a 14-year-old schoolboy in the Kashmir valley. Ever since his parents were killed by jihadis (militants) 10 years ago, he has lived with his aunt and uncle, in a small town called Kupwara in Kashmir valley. All Sikandar's desires revolve around the happiness of his foster parents and getting the ball into the goal on the football field.

One day, on his way to a school football match, Sikandar finds a gun lying on the path. Despite admonishments by his newly made school friend, 14-year-old Nasreen (Ayesha Kapur), Sikandar picks up the gun and begins a journey into the darker side of his nature. The quiet-yet-strong Nasreen becomes Sikandar's conscience keeper. She tries to dissuade him from giving in to the lure of the gun.

Sikandar gets embroiled further and further in situations beyond his control, and people get killed. At first it seems that the happenings occurring alongside Sikandar's predicament are not connected. But, as layer upon layer is revealed, it becomes clear that Sikandar is the innocent victim in a game being played out between the militants, the army, the peace-bartering politicians and the religious heads of the little Kashmiri town. The pieces of the puzzle come together at the very end, leading to a shocking revelation.  The movie is a portrayal of moulding of child psychology, and the making of terrorists.

Cast
Parzan Dastur as Sikandar Raza
Ayesha Kapur as Nasreen
R. Madhavan as Colonel Rajesh Rao
Sanjay Suri as Mukhtar Masoodi
Arunoday Singh as Zahageer Qadir
Rahul Singh as Captain Yashvardhan Singh

Soundtrack

Reception
Nikhat Kazmi, film critic of the Times of India, gave it a 3.5 star rating.

Michelle Orange, film critic of The Village Voice, opined that Sikandar is "a Corking Narrative and Cognent Sketch of Violence".

References

External links
 
 AOL.in Movie Review By Noyon Jyoti Parasara
 Sikandar: Guns over roses
 “In Sikandar I’m depicting that militancy is on wane in Kashmir” – Piyush Jha

2009 films
2000s Hindi-language films
Films about terrorism in India
Films set in Jammu and Kashmir
Kashmir conflict in films